The National Revolutionary Army War Memorial Cemetery in Nanjing was used for burials between 1931 and 1935. It is located at Purple Mountain in the east of Nanjing, and lies west of the Sun Yat-sen Mausoleum, occupying about one square kilometer. After the founding of the People's Republic of China it was renamed "Hope Valley Park."

References

Cemeteries in Nanjing
Museums in Nanjing
Cemeteries established in the 1930s